Twice Upon a Time (1998) is a fantasy romantic comedy TV movie made for the Lifetime cable network, starring Molly Ringwald and George Newbern and directed by Thom Eberhardt. It was written and co-produced by Scott Fifer (who went on to found GO Campaign) for ABC Pictures and Chris/Rose Productions. The film also features Ringwald's own father, blind jazz pianist Robert Ringwald, in a brief role.

Plot Summary
A discontented woman (Ringwald) finds herself in a parallel universe where she is living with an old flame from years ago, but soon begins to wish she was back in her old world with her present lover (Newbern).

References

External links

1998 television films
1998 films
1998 romantic comedy films
1998 fantasy films
Lifetime (TV network) films
Films directed by Thom Eberhardt